Mubarak Dahi Waleed (born ) is a Qatari male volleyball player. With his club Al-Rayyan Sport Club he competed at the 2012 FIVB Volleyball Men's Club World Championship.

References

External links

 profile at FIVB.org

1991 births
Living people
Qatari men's volleyball players
Place of birth missing (living people)
Volleyball players at the 2010 Asian Games
Volleyball players at the 2014 Asian Games
Volleyball players at the 2018 Asian Games
Asian Games competitors for Qatar